Chai Nat is a town (thesaban mueang) in central Thailand, capital of Chai Nat province. It covers the whole tambon tambon Nai Mueang and parts of Ban Kluai, Tha Chai and Khao Tha Phra, all in Mueang Chai Nat district. As of 2006 it had a population of 14,469.

The town is on the banks of the Chao Phraya River. The main road through the town is Phahonyothin Road (Highway 1). Bangkok lies 188 km to the south.

References

External links

http://www.chainatcity.go.th (Thai)

Populated places in Chai Nat province
Populated places on the Chao Phraya River
Cities and towns in Thailand